The Memphite Necropolis (or Pyramid Fields) is a series of ancient Egyptian funerary complexes occupying a thirty kilometer stretch on the Western Desert plateau in the vicinity of the ancient capital of Memphis, Lower Egypt, today in Giza, Egypt. It includes the pyramid complexes of Giza, Abusir, Saqqara and Dahshur, and is listed as the UNESCO World Heritage Site of Memphis and its Necropolis. Most of the pyramids of the Old Kingdom were built here, along with many mastabas and other tombs.

Saqqara
Saqqara is the site of the first Egyptian pyramid, the Pyramid of Djoser, and thus the first pyramid field in the Memphite Necropolis, established in the 27th Century BCE during the Third Dynasty, with another 16 pyramids built over the centuries though the Fifth Dynasty. However, the site was used for burials at least as early as the First Dynasty (Ca. 32nd Century BCE), and remained in almost contiuous use as a cemetary for 3000 years until the Ptolemaic Period (30 BCE).

Dahshur
Dahshur is the second of the pyramid complexes to be established in Egypt, with the unique Bent Pyramid of Sneferu in the Fourth Dynasty during the Old Kingdom (27th Century BCE). The site would be in intermitent use as a burial ground and pyramid field for a millennium where the last of more than six pyramids was built in the 13th Dynasty during the Second Intermediate Period (18th Century BCE).

The necropolis is 2.5 by 6 kilometres, located about 30 kilometres south of Cairo.

Giza
The Pyramids of Giza were the third site to be built, during the Fourth dynasty. They include the Pyramid of Khufu, which is the only remaining wonder of the ancient world. The Great Sphinx is also on this site.

Abusir
Chronologically Abusir was the fourth and last of the pyramid fields to be establsihed, its 14 pyramids were built during the Fifth Dynasty at the end of the Old Kingdom, that lasted 150 years in the 25th and 24th centuries BC.

Excavations
Burials in the Memphite Necropolis include the Apis bulls, falcons, ibises, baboons, and boats.

The tomb of Nakht-Min at the Abusir-Memphite Necropolis  (Kahled Daoud) [ Egypt Exploration Society ] 

An Exploratory Geophysical Survey at the Pyramid Complex of Senwosret III at Dahshur, Egypt, in Search of Boats from Copyright © 1999–2011 John Wiley & Sons, Inc. All Rights Reserved retrieved 12:06GMT 1.10.11

research on constructions within Dashar necropolis since 2008  © 2011 Deutsches Archäologisches Institut (re-retrieved 12:18GMT 2.10.11)

See also 
Memphis
Saqqara
Dahshur
Giza Necropolis
Central Field, Giza
Giza East Field
Giza West Field
Abusir
Ahmed Fakhry
Selim Hassan
Jacques de Morgan
Jacques Kinnaer
Miroslav Verner
Karl Richard Lepsius
Mark Lehner

References

Further reading
 C. J. Martin - Demotic Papyri from the Memphite Necropolis In the Collections of the National Museum of Antiquities in Leiden, the British Museum and the Hermitage Museum (retrieved 11:08GMT 1.10.11)
 Document pertaining to the Book of Coming Forth by Day) -  Maarten J. Raven (retrieved 11:16 1.10.11)

External links
 Leiden Mission database-(Copyright by Feet XL© 2011) retrieved 13:36 1.10.11
 Émile Prisse d'Avennes - [Necropolis of Memphis (pyramids of Giza) - Bibliothèque nationale de France

Ancient Egyptian funerary practices